Sara Errani and Roberta Vinci were the defending champions but decided not to participate.
Irina-Camelia Begu and Anabel Medina Garrigues won the title beating Dominika Cibulková and Arantxa Parra Santonja in the final, 4–6, 7–6(7–3), [11–9].

Seeds

Draw

Draw

References
 Main Draw

Topshelf Openandnbsp;- Doubles
2013 Women's Doubles